Baschkirites is an extinct cephalopod genus belonging to the ammonoid order Goniatitida that lived during the Early Carboniferous (Bashkirian).

Description
The shell of Baschkirites is discoidal, with narrow umbilicus in adult stage. Growth lines are fine, forward slanting, resulting in long ventrolateral salients (protrusions). The entire shell may be covered with simple and sometimes granose spiral ornamentation. Ventral lobe of the suture is wide and V-shaped, with moderately high median saddle; the first lateral saddle is rounded or subacute, the adventitious lobe deep and acute.

Distribution
Carboniferous of the Russian Federation, United States, Uzbekistan

References
Notes

Web Links
Baschkirites in Goniat
W. M. Furnish, et al. 2009. Treatise on Invertebrate Paleontology, Part L, Revised: Mollusca 4, Volume 2: Carboniferous and Permian Ammonoidea

Mississippian ammonites
Fossils of Uzbekistan
Bashkirian life